Podwilk  is a village in the administrative district of Gmina Jabłonka, within Nowy Targ County, Lesser Poland Voivodeship, in southern Poland, close to the border with Slovakia. The village has a population of 2,200.

The village lies in the drainage basin of the Black Sea (through Orava, Váh and Danube rivers), in the historical region of Orava (Polish: Orawa).

History
The area became part of Poland in the 10th or early 11th century, and later it passed to Hungary. It became again part of Poland following World War I.

References

External links
 Jewish Community in Podwilk on Virtual Shtetl

Villages in Nowy Targ County